Honoré-Beaugrand station is a Montreal Metro station in the borough of Mercier–Hochelaga-Maisonneuve in Montreal, Quebec, Canada. It is operated by the Société de transport de Montréal (STM) and is the eastern terminus of the Green Line. It is located in the district of Tétreaultville. The station opened on June 6, 1976, replacing Frontenac station as the terminus.

Overview 
Designed by Papineau, Gérin-Lajoie, Le Blanc, Edwards, it is a normal side platform station built in open cut. A vast mezzanine at the eastern end of the station provides access to three exits, two of which are surrounded by bus loops serving a large number of bus routes from the east end of the island. The stairs from the mezzanine to the platforms are surmounted by ceramic murals, one the reverse of the other, by Jean-Paul Mousseau.

Entrances/exits are at 7950 and 7955, rue Sherbrooke and 4755, rue Honoré-Beaugrand.

The station is equipped with the MétroVision information screens which displays news, commercials, and the time till the next train.

In 2016, work began on a $20m renovation project at the station, including waterproofing, replacement of paving & lighting and the installation of three elevators. In December 2018, the station became the 14th accessible Metro station on the network.

Origin of the name
Honoré-Beaugrand was named after the adjoining rue Honoré-Beaugrand, which was in turn named after Honoré Beaugrand, who served as mayor of Montreal from 1885 to 1887. He founded the Montreal newspaper La Patrie in 1879. Soon after, he left the city to travel and write.

Terminus Honoré-Beaugrand 
There is a bus terminus on both sides of Sherbrooke Street

Connecting bus routes

Nearby points of interest
 Centre hospitalier juif de l'Espérance
 Louis Hippolyte Lafontaine Tunnel
 Village Champlain

References

External links

 Honoré-Beaugrand Station - official site
 Montreal by Metro, metrodemontreal.com - photos, information, and trivia
 2011 STM System Map
 Metro Map

Accessible Montreal Metro stations
Green Line (Montreal Metro)
Brutalist architecture in Canada
Mercier–Hochelaga-Maisonneuve
Railway stations in Canada opened in 1976